

Background
There were 2 by elections held in 1977 where both People's Action Party's Members of Parliament, N. Govindasamy and Lim Guan Hoo had died suddenly, which vacates Radin Mas and Bukit Merah respectively. Through co-operation within the opposition camp, no 3 corner / multiple corner fights were shown in both by-elections.

First 1977 By Election (May)
With the demise of N. Govindasamy who was the then incumbent of Radin Mas, it sets the first by election in 1977 with the polling day on 14 May 1977 and the nomination day was set on 4 May 1977.

Second 1977 By Election (July)
With the demise of Lim Guan Hoo who was the then incumbent of Bukit Merah, it sets the second by election in 1977 with the polling day on 23 July 1977 and the nomination day was set on 13 July 1977.

Election deposit
The election deposit was set at $1200. Similar with previous elections, the election deposit will be forfeited if the particular candidate had failed to secure at least 12.5% or one-eighth of the votes.

Results

References
Background of First 1977 By election
Background of Second 1977 By election
Results of First 1977 By election
Results of Second 1977 By election

1977
Singapore
By-elections
Singaporean by-elections
Singaporean by-elections